Paul Nugent may refer to:

Paul Nugent (Gaelic footballer), Gaelic footballer and selector
Paul Nugent (Scottish footballer) (born 1983), Scottish footballer currently playing for Dumbarton